The second 1798 United States Senate special election in New York was held on August 17, 1798, by the New York State Legislature to elect a U.S. Senator (Class 1) to represent the State of New York in the United States Senate.

Background
Federalist John Sloss Hobart had been elected in January 1798 for the remainder of Philip Schuyler's term (1797–1803) but had resigned on April 16 after his appointment to the United States District Court for the District of New York. Federalist William North was appointed by Governor John Jay to fill the vacancy temporarily, and took his seat on May 21, Congress being in session until July 16, 1798. 

At the State election in April 1798, Federalist majorities were elected to both houses of the 22nd New York State Legislature which met from August 9 to 17, 1798; and from January 2 to April 3, 1799, at Albany, New York.

Candidates
Ex-Speaker James Watson, a State Senator until the previous session, was the candidate of the Federalist Party. 

First Judge of the Albany County Court John Tayler was the candidate of the Democratic-Republican Party.

Result
Watson was the choice of both the State Senate and the State Assembly, and was declared elected.

Aftermath
Watson took his seat on December 11, 1798, but resigned on March 19, 1800, after his appointment as Naval Officer of the Port of New York. The State Legislature held a special election in April 1800, and elected Gouverneur Morris to fill the vacancy.

See also
1798 United States Senate special elections in New York
January 1798 United States Senate special election in New York

References
The New York Civil List compiled in 1858 (see: pg. 63 for U.S. Senators; pg. 117 for State Senators 1798-99; page 172 for Members of Assembly 1798-99)
Members of the Fifth United States Congress
Members of the Sixth United States Congress
History of Political Parties in the State of New-York by Jabez Delano Hammond (pages 121f)
Election result at Tufts University Library project "A New Nation Votes" (omits part of the text, it should read: "...James Watson [of New York City, 30 votes; John Tayler,] esq. of Albany 9 - Maj. 21")

New York 1798 08
New York 1798 08
1798 08 Special
New York Special 08
United States Senate Special 08
United States Senate 1798 08